The Provence-class ironclads consisted of 10 ironclad frigates built for the French Navy during the 1860s. Only one of the sister ships was built with an wrought iron hull; the others were built in wood. By 1865 they were armed with eleven  guns and played a minor role in the 1870–1871 Franco-Prussian War. The ships began to be disposed of in the early 1880s, although several lingered on in subsidiary roles for another decade before they followed their sisters to the scrap yard.

Design and description

The Provence class was designed by naval architect Henri Dupuy de Lôme as an enlarged version of the s with thicker armor, more powerful guns, and better seakeeping qualities. They displaced . All of the ships except  had wooden hulls; that ship had an iron hull. They had a crew of 579–594 officers and enlisted men.

Armament and protection

The main battery of the Provence-class ships was intended to be thirty  Modèle 1858–60 rifled muzzle-loading (RML) guns, but this was changed to eleven  Modèle 1864 smoothbore muzzle-loading guns in 1865. Ten of the 194 mm Modèle 1864 guns were mounted on the broadside and one was on a pivot mount below the forecastle deck as a chase gun. Three years later, their armament was changed to eight  RMLs and four 194 mm smoothbores.

The conning tower's sides consisted of  armor plates.

Ships

Notes

Citations

Bibliography

 

Ironclad classes
 
Ships built in France
Ship classes of the French Navy